Sri Madduramma Temple, located in Huskur (Anekal Taluk) in the city of Bangalore, Karnataka, India, is a temple dedicated to the Hindu deity Madduramma. It is the oldest temple dates back to the Chola period. Every year the Grand festival is celebrated during March or April month.

Reference List 

Hindu temples in Bangalore
Chola architecture